October 24 - Eastern Orthodox liturgical calendar - October 26

All fixed commemorations below celebrated on November 7 by Eastern Orthodox Churches on the Old Calendar.

For October 25th, Orthodox Churches on the Old Calendar commemorate the Saints listed on October 12.

Saints
 Saint Tabitha the Alsmgiver, the widow resurrected by the Apostle Peter (Acts 9:36-43) (1st century)
 Martyrs Pappias, Diodorus and Claudianus, of Attaleia in Pamphylia, by beheading (c. 249-251)  (see also: February 3)
 Martyr Anastasius the Fuller, at Salona in Dalmatia (3rd century) (see also: December 5)
 Martyr Valerinus, by the sword.
 Martyrs Valerius and Chrysaphos, by the sword.
 Martyr Sabinus, by fire.
 Martyrs Faustus, Basil and Lucianus, of Darion in Constantinople, by the sword. (see also: February 6)
 Martyrs Nicephorus and Stephen, by flogging.  (see also: February 8)
 Saints Philadelphus and Polycarp.  (see also: February 8)
 Two martyrs of Thrace, crushed between two large rocks.
 Martyrs Marcian and Martyrius the Notaries, of Constantinople (355) 
 Saint George, Bishop of Amastrida and canon-writer (c. 805)

Pre-Schism Western saints
 Saints Front and George, Bishops and Apostles of Périgueux, in France (2nd century)
 Martyr Miniatus of Florence (Minias), venerated as the first Christian martyr of Florence (251) 
 Martyrs of Rome, including soldier-martyrs Theodosius, Lucius, Mark and Peter, under Claudius II (269) 
 Saints Crispinus and Crispinianus, brothers, missionaries, martyred under Diocletian at Soissons (289) 
 Saint Cyrinus (Quirinus), a martyr in Rome under Diocletian (3rd century)
 Martyrs Protus and Januarius, beheaded in Porto Torres, Sardinia, Italy (303) 
 Saint Gaudentius of Brescia, Bishop of Brescia, a theologian and author of many letters and sermons (410) 
 Saint Lupus of Bayeux, Bishop of Bayeux (5th century)
 Saint Hilary of Mende (Hilarius), Bishop of Mende (535) 
 Saint Dulcardus, a monk at Micy Abbey (Saint-Mesmin) in Orleans in France, then a hermit near Bourges, where the village of Saint-Doulchard still exists (584)
 Saint Hildemarca, a nun at the convent of St Eulalia in Bordeaux, who became Abbess of Fécamp Abbey in the north of France (c. 670)
 Saint Goeznoveus, Bishop of Léon in Brittany (675) 
 Saints Fructus (Frutos), Valentine and Engratia, two brothers and a sister who lived in Sépulveda in Castile in Spain (715)

Post-Schism Orthodox saints
 Saint Martyrius, deacon, and Saint Martyrius, recluse, of the Kiev Caves (13th-14th centuries)
 Venerable Macarius, Bishop of Paphos on Cyprus (1688)  (see also: February 8 )

New Martys and Confessors
 Saint Matrona (Vlasova) the Confessor, of Diveyevo Convent (1963)

Other commemorations
 The Translation of the relics of Venerable John of Beverley, Bishop of York took place this day. However, this took place in 1307 and is not an Orthodox feast.

Icon gallery

Notes

References

Sources
 October 25 / November 7. Orthodox Calendar (PRAVOSLAVIE.RU).
 November 7 / October 25. HOLY TRINITY RUSSIAN ORTHODOX CHURCH (A parish of the Patriarchate of Moscow).
 October 25. OCA - The Lives of the Saints.
 The Autonomous Orthodox Metropolia of Western Europe and the Americas (ROCOR). St. Hilarion Calendar of Saints for the year of our Lord 2004. St. Hilarion Press (Austin, TX). pp. 79–80.
 The Twenty-Fifth Day of the Month of October. Orthodoxy in China.
 October 25. Latin Saints of the Orthodox Patriarchate of Rome.
 The Roman Martyrology. Transl. by the Archbishop of Baltimore. Last Edition, According to the Copy Printed at Rome in 1914. Revised Edition, with the Imprimatur of His Eminence Cardinal Gibbons. Baltimore: John Murphy Company, 1916. pp. 329–330.
 Rev. Richard Stanton. A Menology of England and Wales, or, Brief Memorials of the Ancient British and English Saints Arranged According to the Calendar, Together with the Martyrs of the 16th and 17th Centuries. London: Burns & Oates, 1892. p. 514.
Greek Sources
 Great Synaxaristes:  25 ΟΚΤΩΒΡΙΟΥ. ΜΕΓΑΣ ΣΥΝΑΞΑΡΙΣΤΗΣ.
  Συναξαριστής. 25 Οκτωβρίου. ECCLESIA.GR. (H ΕΚΚΛΗΣΙΑ ΤΗΣ ΕΛΛΑΔΟΣ).
  25/10/2017. Ορθόδοξος Συναξαριστής. 
Russian Sources
  7 ноября (25 октября). Православная Энциклопедия под редакцией Патриарха Московского и всея Руси Кирилла (электронная версия). (Orthodox Encyclopedia - Pravenc.ru).
  25 октября по старому стилю / 7 ноября по новому стилю. Русская Православная Церковь - Православный церковный календарь на 2016 год.

October in the Eastern Orthodox calendar